The India State Hunger Index (ISHI) is a tool to calculate hunger and malnutrition at the regional level in India. It is constructed in the same fashion as the Global Hunger Index (GHI) 2008 and was calculated for 17 states in India, covering more than 95 percent of the population. 

The ISHI was developed by the International Food Policy Research Institute (IFPRI) and presented for the first time 2008 in conjunction with the non-governmental organization Wealthhungerlife and the Department of Economics, University of California.

According to the GHI, India has shown improvement between 2000 and 2020, however the level of hunger remains in the "serious" category.

Background 

Despite the good economic performance, with over 200 million people who are food insecure. India is home to the largest number of hungry people in the world. In the ranking of the Global Hunger Index 2017 it covers position 100 out of 119 ranked countries and has a "serious" (31.4) food security situation. The major problem in the country is the high prevalence of underweight children under five, which is a result of low nutrition and educational status of women. 

While there has been attention to hunger and undernourishment at the central level, within India's political system, states are important political units with regard to the planning and execution of development programs. Thus unpacking the hunger index at the level of the federal states is an important tool to build awareness of the disparities in hunger among them. In addition, the variability of the relative contribution of the underlying components of the hunger index across the different Indian states can help to stimulate the discussion about the drivers of hunger in different state contexts.

Indicators and underlying data

The ISHI is constructed in the same fashion as the Global Hunger Index which follows a multidimensional approach to measuring hunger and malnutrition. 

It combines three equally weighted indicators:

 the proportion of undernourished as a percentage of the population (reflecting the share of the population with insufficient dietary intake);
 the prevalence of underweight children under the age of five (indicating the proportion of children suffering from weight loss and / or reduced growth); and 
 the mortality rate of children under the age of five (partially reflecting the fatal synergy between dietary intake and unhealthy environments).

The ISHI uses two data sources for the estimation of the Indian state level: These are the first rounds of the National Family Health Survey (2005–2006) for India and the National Sample Survey data from 2004 to 2005. It is calculated and presented for 17 major states, covering 95 percent of the country's population. While the National Family Health Survey has a large enough sample size to yield representative estimates of the child underweight and mortality rates even for the smaller states and union territories in the country, the sample size of the National Sample Survey is insufficient for estimating undernourishment rates in these places. Therefore, the ISHI restricts the sample to those states for which it yields precise states level estimates.

Key findings 

ISHI 2008 scores for Indian states range from 13.6 ("serious") for Punjab to 30.9 ("extremely alarming") for Madhya Pradesh, indicating substantial variability among states in India. Punjab is ranked 34th when compared to the GHI 2008 worldwide country ranking, while Madhya Pradesh is ranked 82nd. In this state more people suffer from hunger than in Ethiopia or Sudan. 60 percent of the children are undernourished.
All 17 states have ISHI scores that are "serious" to "extremely alarming" hunger categories. Twelve of the 17 states fall into the "alarming" category while Madhya Pradesh falls into "extremely alarming" category.
ISHI scores are closely aligned with poverty, but there is little association with state level economic growth. High levels of hunger are seen in states that are performing well from an economic perspective.
Inclusive economic growth and targeted strategies to ensure food sufficiency reduce child mortality and improve child nutrition are urgent priorities for all states in India.

2008 index

References

Bibliography

Literature 

 IFPRI/University of California/Welthungerhilfe (2008) The India State Hunger Index: Comparisons of Hunger across States.

External links 
 International Food Policy Research Institute (IFPRI)
 Welthungerhilfe

Development studies

Health in India by state or union  territory
Food politics

Poverty in India
Malnutrition in India